Hugh McLeod (1843 – August 5, 1879) was a Scottish-born lawyer and political figure in Nova Scotia, Canada. He represented Cape Breton in the House of Commons of Canada from 1878 to 1879 as a Liberal-Conservative member.

He was born in Logie Easter Parish, Ross-shire, the son of the Reverend Hugh McLeod (Canadian minister), DD (Moderator of the Presbyterian Church in Canada in 1877) and Catherine Ross, and came to Canada with his family in 1850. He was educated in Sydney, Truro and at McGill University.  McLeod was called to the Nova Scotia bar in 1868. He ran unsuccessfully for a seat in the House of Commons in 1872 and 1874. He died in office at the age of 36.

His brother William Mackenzie McLeod succeeded him in the House of Commons, serving until 1882.

Electoral record

References 
 
The Canadian parliamentary companion and annual register, 1879, CH Mackintosh

1843 births
1879 deaths
Members of the House of Commons of Canada from Nova Scotia
Conservative Party of Canada (1867–1942) MPs
McGill University alumni